Isolezwe is a Zulu-language newspaper launched in 2002 by Independent News & Media. It is published daily in Durban, South Africa, in the tabloid format. Editor Kiki Ntuli describes their target market as "the modernising Zulu ... [s]omeone who may go back home to the rural areas to slaughter a cow to amadlozi [the ancestors], but is as equally comfortable taking his family out for dinner and a movie in a shopping mall".

History
In June 2004, Isolezwe launched their online edition; their fellow Independent News & Media publications described it as the first Zulu-language news website. In the five years after its founding, it performed much better than Independent's English-language South African dailies, growing from a circulation of under 30,000 to more than 95,000, according to Audit Bureau of Circulations figures. Much of their circulation consists of single-copy sales rather than subscriptions. It continued its strong performance in the first quarter of 2010, with a 34% increase in circulation to 104,481, as compared to industry-wide 2.3% drop in sales. Circulation for their Sunday edition, Isolezwe ngeSonto, also reached 71,219. Paper insiders disagreed on the reasons for the growth; editor-in-chief Mbathi credited human-interest stories and local news, while joint managing director Brian Porter mentioned editorial content and sports as "vital ingredients".

Language
Isozwele is known for using a more urban form of Zulu, in contrast to its competitor Ilanga, which describes itself as using a "purer form" of the language.

Distribution areas

Distribution figures

Readership figures

See also
 List of newspapers in South Africa

References

External links
 Isolezwe online edition
 SAARF Website

Mass media in Durban
Daily newspapers published in South Africa
Publications established in 2002
Zulu-language mass media
2002 establishments in South Africa